Love Beats Rhymes is an American musical drama film directed by RZA. The film stars Azealia Banks as a 25-year-old rapper from Staten Island, New York who wants to pursue a music career. The film also stars Lorraine Toussaint, Jill Scott, Lucien Laviscount, MC Jin, Hana Mae Lee, John David Washington and Common. The film was released on December 1, 2017 by CodeBlack Films and Lionsgate.

Cast  
 Azealia Banks as Coco Ford
 Lucien Laviscount as Derek, Coco's love interest
 Jill Scott as Professor Dixon
 Lorraine Toussaint as Nichelle, Coco's mother
 John David Washington as Mahlik
 Hana Mae Lee as Julie
 Common as Coltrane
 MC Jin as Jin
 Jeremie Harris as Matt
 Esperanza Spalding as Herself
 Monna Sabouri as Girl
 Mary Christina Brown as Sapphire
 Caleb Eberhardt as Reasons

Production 
On May 26, 2015, it was announced that Azealia Banks will be making her feature film debut in Coco directed by Rza and produced by Lionsgate. Lorraine Toussaint, Common, Jill Scott, Hana Mae Lee, and Lucien Laviscount were also cast. Filming began in New York City in late May 2015 in Wagner College, Staten Island and concluded in late June 2015. An initial March 11, 2016 release date was pushed back to a date still undetermined. When referring to the film in a June 2016 interview, RZA told Rolling Stone that "Coco is done. It's in Lionsgate's hands now. Movie companies have to figure out the best time to put their movies out. So I don't know if it'll be this year or next year."

Release
On October 11, 2017, Lionsgate released a trailer for the film, now with the new title Love Beats Rhymes and a new December 1, 2017 release date in selected theaters and video on demand formats.

Reception
On review aggregator Rotten Tomatoes, the film holds an approval rating of 44% based on 9 reviews, with an average rating of 5.13/10.

Home media

The film was released on DVD on January 2, 2018.

References

External links 
 
 

2017 films
2010s musical drama films
American musical drama films
Films shot in New York City
Films set in New York City
Films directed by RZA
Films scored by Richard Gibbs
2010s hip hop films
Lionsgate films
African-American films
2017 drama films
2010s English-language films
2010s American films